New Works Celebration is an album by Bob Brookmeyer's New Art Orchestra featuring tracks recorded in 1997 and released on the Challenge label.

Reception

Ken Dryden of AllMusic called it a "stunning release" that is "Highly recommended!". on All About Jazz Douglas Payne said "The captivating New Work (Celebration), though, is remarkable evidence of the intricate musical language Bob Brookmeyer has crafted as a composer. In the realm of his own inner logic - informed by Sauter and Stravinsky as much as George Russell and even Boulez - Brookmeyer has conceived something that is as warm and passionate as it is cerebral and sometimes startling". The Penguin Guide to Jazz nominated the album as part of its "Core Collection" of recommended jazz recordings.

Track listing
All compositions by Bob Brookmeyer.

 "Celebration Jig" - 2:31
 "Celebration Slow Dance" - 8:23
 "Celebration Remembering" - 10:59   
 "Celebration Two And" - 10:16   
 "Idyll" - 9:37
 "Duets" - 12:45
 "Cameo" - 4:28
 "Boom Boom" - 9:32

Personnel 
Bob Brookmeyer - valve trombone
Thorsten Benkenstein, Jorg Engels, Ralf Hesse, Torsten Mass, Sebastian Strempel - trumpet
Christian Jakso, Ludwig Nuss, Ansgar Striepens - trombone
Edward Partyka - bass trombone
Marko Lackner, Stefan Pfeifer - alto saxophone
Marcus Bartelt, Scott Robinson - baritone saxophone
Nils van Haften, Paul Heller - tenor saxophone
Kris Goessens - piano
Jurgen Grimm - keyboard
Ingmar Heller - bass  
John Hollenbeck - drums
Christopher Dell - percussion

References 

1999 albums
Bob Brookmeyer albums
Challenge Records (1994) albums